Ostelsheim is a municipality in the district of Calw in Baden-Württemberg in Germany.

Geography

Geographical location
Ostelsheim is located at the extreme limit of the Black Forest. Protected from bad weather, it is surrounded by hills and forests. Typical of the landscape around the city are the still largely preserved in its original appearance landscape parts with numerous rear belts, stone bars and sheep pastures. Around a quarter of the 923-hectare mountain area consists of forest.

Neighboring communities
To Ostelsheim borders the municipalities Althengstett, Simmozheim, Weil der Stadt, Grafenau and Gechingen.

Municipality arrangement
The municipality Ostelsheim includes the village Ostelsheim and the place Sägemühle.

History
The place is probably an Alemannic founding  from 4th century. In 1357 the city came together with Böblingen to the County of Württemberg. As part of the country Württemberg-Hohenzollern the municipality came in 1952 to the newly founded State of Baden-Württemberg. The municipality Ostelsheim retained even after the regional reorganization in 1975 in their independence.

Ostelsheim in the year 1681

Politics

Council
The local elections on 7 June 2009 yielded the following distribution of seats:
FWG	100%	± 0	12 seats	± 0

Economy and Infrastructure

Transportation
Through the municipality runs no federal road, however, national road B 295 ( Stuttgart - Calw ) is three kilometers north of Ostelsheim in Simmozheim. The nearest motorway junction is Böblingen-Hulb on the 81, about twelve kilometers south-east.
Ostelsheim is located at the Black Forest Railway (Württemberg) who comes from Stuttgart via Weil der Stadt to town and then continues to Calw. The community, however, was disconnected due to the decommissioning of the section between Weil der Stadt and Calw for freight in 1988. The passenger transport was already shut down in 1983. The nearest railway station is now located about three kilometers in Weil der Stadt. From there are regular buses over Ostelsheim to Calw. The county is planning, the reactivation of the railway line.

Water Supply
The municipality Ostelsheim draws its drinking water from the Zweckverband Schwarzwald water supply, to which it belongs since 1976. Since 1972, there was already a water supply contract with the Zweckverband.

Christian religions
Ostelsheim is dominated Protestant since the Reformation. The Protestant church has its home in the centrally located village church, the rectory and parish hall are located in the immediate vicinity.

Personality

Sons and daughters of the town
Gottlieb Wilhelm Hoffmann (1771-1846), notary and mayor, founder of the Württemberg Brethren in Korntal and Wilhelmsdorf

References

Calw (district)
Württemberg